The BMW 5 Series is an executive car manufactured and marketed by BMW since 1972, succeeding the New Class Sedans, and currently in its seventh generation.

The 5 Series was initially available as a sedan, with a wagon/estate body style (marketed as "Touring") added in 1991 and a 5-door fastback configuration (marketed as "Gran Turismo") available from 2009 to 2017. Each successive generation carries a distinct internal E- designation.

The first generation of 5 Series was powered by naturally aspirated four-cylinder and six-cylinder petrol engines. Following generations have been powered by four-cylinder, six-cylinder, V8 and V10 engines that are either naturally aspirated or turbocharged. Since 1982, diesel engines have been included in the 5 Series range.

The 5 Series is BMW's second-best-selling model after the 3 Series. On 29 January 2008, the 5 millionth 5 Series was manufactured, a 530d sedan in Carbon Black Metallic.

BMW's three-digit model naming convention began with the first 5 Series, thus the 5 Series was BMW's first model line to use "Series" in the name.

Since the E28, all generations of 5 Series have included an "M" model, called the BMW M5.

First generation (E12; 1972–1981)

The E12 is the first generation of 5 Series, and was manufactured for model years 1972–1981. It replaced the New Class sedans and was produced in the sedan body style. The initial models were powered by four-cylinder engines, with a six-cylinder engine introduced a year later.

There was no M5 model for the E12, however the E12 M535i is considered the predecessor to the M5.

The E12 was replaced by the E28 in 1981, with E12 production continuing until 1984, in South Africa.

Second generation (E28; 1981–1988)

The E28 is the second generation of 5 Series, manufactured for model years 1981-1988 as a sedan. It was initially offered with petrol four-cylinder and six-cylinder engines.

In 1983, a diesel engine became available for the first time in a 5 Series. The E28 was the first 5 Series with the centre console angled towards the driver and the option of anti-lock brakes (ABS).

The E28 M5 began a line of M5 high performance models that has continued through every generation since. It was powered by the S38B35 and the M88/3 six-cylinder engines.

Third generation (E34; 1988–1996)

The E34 is the third generation of the 5 Series, manufactured for model years 1988–1996. It was launched in the sedan body style, with the range expanded in 1990 to include the "Touring" wagon/estate body style.

The E34 was the first 5 Series to be available with the wagon body style, all-wheel drive and V8 engines. It also saw the introduction of stability control (ASC), traction control (ASC+T) a 6-speed manual transmission and adjustable damping (EDC) to the 5 Series range.

Nine different engine families were used over its lifetime, consisting of four-cylinder, six-cylinder and V8 petrol engines, and six-cylinder diesel engines.

The E34 M5 is powered by the S38 six-cylinder engine and was produced in sedan and wagon body styles.

Fourth generation (E39; 1995–2004)

The E39 is the fourth generation of 5 Series, which was manufactured for model years 1995–2004. It was launched in the sedan body style, with the wagon/estate body style (marketed as "Touring") introduced in 1996.

The E39 was the first 5 Series to use aluminium components in the front suspension. The proportion of chassis components using aluminium significantly increased for the E39, in order to reduce weight. It was also the first 5 Series where a four-cylinder diesel engine was available.

V8 models used recirculating ball steering (as per previous 5 Series generations), however rack and pinion steering was used for the first time, in the four-cylinder and six-cylinder models. Unlike its E34 predecessor and E60 successor, the E39 was not available with all-wheel drive.

The E39 M5 sedan was introduced in 1998, powered by the 4.9-litre S62 V8 engine.

Fifth generation (E60/E61; 2003–2010)

The E60/E61 is the fifth generation of the 5 Series, which was sold from 2003 to 2010. The body styles of the range are:
 4-door sedan/saloon (E60 model code)
 5-door estate/wagon (E61 model code, marketed as "Touring")

The E60 generation introduced various electronic features to the 5 Series, including iDrive, head-up display, active cruise control, active steering and voice control. The E60 also was the first 5 Series available with a turbocharged petrol engine, a 6-speed automatic transmission and regenerative braking. New safety features for the E60 included adaptive headlights, night vision, active headrests, Lane Departure Warning and high intensity emergency brake lights.

The E60/E61 M5 was released in 2005 and was powered by the S85 V10 engine. It was sold in the sedan and wagon body styles, with most cars using a 7-speed automated manual transmission ("SMG III"). However, in the North American Markets, there was the option to buy the BMW M5 in a manual version.

Sixth generation (F10/F11/F07/F18; 2010–2017)

The BMW F10/F11/F07/F18 is the sixth generation of the BMW 5 Series, which was manufactured for model years 2010–2017. The body styles of the range are:
 4-door sedan/saloon (F10)
 5-door estate/wagon (F11, marketed as "Touring")
 5-door fastback (F07, marketed as "Gran Turismo")
 4-door long wheelbase sedan (F18, sold only in China and the Middle East)

The F07 Gran Turismo was the only 5 Series to date produced as a fastback. The F10 was also the first 5 Series to offer a hybrid drivetrain, a turbocharged V8 engine, an 8-speed automatic transmission, a dual-clutch transmission (in the all f10 series ), active rear-wheel steering (called "Integral Active Steering"), electric power steering, double-wishbone front suspension, an LCD instrument cluster (called "Black Panel Display") and automatic parking (called "Parking Assistant").

The F10 M5 was powered by the S63 twin-turbo V8 engine with a 7-speed dual clutch transmission. It was the first M5 to use a turbocharged engine. Like the previous generation, the F10 M5, in North America was sold with a manual transmission.

Seventh generation (G30/G31/G38; 2017–2023) 

The BMW G30/G31/G38 is the seventh generation of the 5 Series. It was officially announced in October 2016, and sales began in February 2017.

Body styles included:
 4-door sedan/saloon (G30)
 5-door wagon/estate (G31)
 4-door long-wheelbase saloon (G38)
The fastback 5 Series GT model from the previous generation is no longer offered, and was moved to the 6 Series range.

The G30 is based on the same modular platform as the 7 Series (G11). The G30 is the first 5 Series to be offered with a plug-in hybrid powertrain, the 530e iPerformance,  which would have the advanced driver-assistance systems found in the 7 Series.
The F90 M5 is the M5 performance model for the G30 generation, and is the first M5 to employ an all-wheel drive powertrain. The X-Drive system allowed for the front differential to disconnect and provide a rear-wheel drive experience to the vehicle.  It is powered by an upgraded version of the S63 twin-turbo V8 engine used in the previous generation F10 M5.

Eighth generation (G60/G61/G68; 2024) 
The BMW G60/G61/G68 is the eighth generation of the 5 Series. It is expected to be revealed in October 2023. The fastback 6 Series Gran Turismo model has been discontinued.

Production and sales

Current production is located in Dingolfing, Germany, Shenyang, China and Magna Steyr, Austria.

References 

5 Series
Hatchbacks
Executive cars
Full-size vehicles
Rear-wheel-drive vehicles
All-wheel-drive vehicles
Sports sedans
1980s cars
1990s cars
2000s cars
2010s cars
2020s cars
Station wagons
Cars introduced in 1972